East Africa University (EAU) is a non-for-profit institution university in the autonomous Puntland state in northeastern Somalia, as well as in neighbouring Somaliland. Founded in the commercial capital of Bosaso, it has additional branches in Buhodle, Galdogob, Galkayo, Garowe and Qardho and in Erigavo in Somaliland. The college offers courses in seven core departments including: Medicine, engineering, veterinary, Business Admin, Sharia studies, It also operates distance learning center.

Overview

A former Bender Qassim University institution, East Africa University was established in 1999 in Bosaso by a group of Somali. It began offering courses in October of the year to around 500 students.

It was attended by Puntland government officials, business and civil society groups, as well as many civilians. The first batch of students completed degree requirements in February 2005 and graduated several months later, in June.

EAU initially offered courses in two main areas: Arabic and Islamic studies, as well as business administration in the college set aside for the purpose. It later grew to include more intensive language courses. Additional professors were subsequently hired to accommodate the broadened syllabus.

EAU offers various programs and diplomas to Somalia's undergraduate students.

Branches
East Africa University was initially based in the suburbs of Bosaso, situated in the far northeastern Bari province. However, it has since expanded operations and opened up new branches in Erigavo, Galdogob, Galkayo, Buhoodle, Garowe and Qardho. On 18 April 2012, the university opened a seventh branch in Buhodle to serve pupils from the Ayn region.

On 18 March 2013, the Puntland government donated land in Garowe to facilitate the institution's growth in the administrative capital.

Programs and degrees
As of 2013, the university's Bosaso campus focuses on business and social sciences. Its Galkayo branch concentrates on computer science and engineering, in addition to health science.

Three, four or five year bachelor degrees are presented to all undergraduate students upon successful completion of course requirements. The Higher Institute of Health Science on the Galkayo campus likewise offers two-year general nursing and medical laboratory diplomas.

In order to develop the capacity of the Puntland government's statistics department, the university also provides short courses for the Puntland Ministry of Planning and International Cooperation. These classes are structured along three phases, each held during the afternoon over a period of four months.

Additionally, the institution offers short courses earmarked for legal professionals.

Faculties/Departments

EAU provides bachelor's degree courses in nine undergraduate faculties. These departments include:

Core faculties
Faculty of Public Administration
Faculty of Business Administration
Faculty of Shariah and Islamic Studies
Faculty of Computer Science
Faculty of Education
Faculty of Medicine
Faculty of Health Sciences
Faculty of Economics
Faculty of Law
Faculty of Engineering
Faculty of Veterinary
Faculty of Community Development

Academic programmes
Bachelor of Business Administration
Bachelor of Sharia and Islamic Studies
Bachelor of Computer Science
Bachelor of Education
Bachelor of Economics
Bachelor of Engineering
Bachelor of Veterinary
Bachelor of Community Development
Bachelor of Medicine

Galkacyo campus
Faculty of Business Administration
Faculty of Shariah and Islamic Studies
Faculty of Computer Science
Bachelor of Community Development
Faculty of Health Sciences
- Nursing Department
- Public Health Department
- Medical Laboratory
Faculty of Economics
Faculty of Education
Semester-based
Three-year duration
Four - Year Duration
Bachelor degree
Higher Institute of Languages (English - Arabic)
One-year duration

Virtual Distance Electronic Learning Center
Besides classroom-based education, the university offers distance learning through its Virtual Distance Electronic Learning Center (VDEL). The VDEL program aims to facilitate access to an international pool of knowledge; offer standard education through information technology; fulfil local demands in terms of education, professional courses and training; offer online classes to complete and enhance extant courses; simplify delivery of additional learning materials to undergraduate and postgraduate students; deploy institutional resources to contribute to national and communal development; make use of digital libraries; connect with other global online universities; and attract further collaborative endeavours with other international organizations.

Funding
Funding for the university comes from both local and international contributors.

Notes

References

External links
East Africa University website
East Africa University - Facebook

Universities in Somaliland
Universities in Somalia
Bosaso
1999 establishments in Somaliland
1999 establishments in Somalia
Educational institutions established in 1999